The 1974–75 network television schedule for the three major English language commercial broadcast networks in the United States. The schedule covers primetime hours from September 1974 through August 1975. The schedule is followed by a list per network of returning series, new series, and series cancelled after the 1973–74 season.

PBS, the Public Broadcasting Service, was in operation, but the schedule was set by each local station.

This is the last of the four seasons to carry a 21-hour (three hours every day) weekly prime time schedule, which was used from 1971 to 1975.

New series are highlighted in bold.

All times are U.S. Eastern and Pacific Time (except for some live sports or events). Subtract for one hour for Central, Mountain, Alaska and Hawaii-Aleutian times.

Each of the 30 highest-rated shows is listed with its rank and rating as determined by Nielsen Media Research.

Legend

Sunday

Note: 60 Minutes aired at 6:00-7:00 pm on CBS from September 1974 to June 1975.

Monday

Tuesday

Wednesday

Note: Dan August consisted of reruns of the 1970-1971 ABC series.

Thursday

Friday

Saturday

By network

ABC

Returning Series
The ABC Sunday Night Movie
Monday Night Football
ABC Movie of the Week
Happy Days
Kung Fu
Marcus Welby, M.D.
The Odd Couple
The Rookies
The Six Million Dollar Man
The Streets of San Francisco

New Series
Baretta *
Barney Miller *
Caribe *
Get Christie Love!
Harry O
Hot l Baltimore *
The Jim Stafford Show *
Karen *
Keep on Truckin' *
Kodiak
Kolchak: The Night Stalker
Nakia
The New Land
Paper Moon
The Sonny Comedy Revue
S.W.A.T. *
The Texas Wheelers
That's My Mama

Not returning from 1973–74:
Bob & Carol & Ted & Alice
The Brady Bunch
Chopper One
The Cowboys
Dick Clark Presents the Rock and Roll Years
Doc Elliot
The F.B.I.
Firehouse
Griff
Love, American Style
Owen Marshall: Counselor at Law
The Partridge Family
Room 222
Temperatures Rising
Toma

CBS

Returning Series
60 Minutes
All in the Family
Apple's Way
Barnaby Jones
The Bob Newhart Show
CBS Thursday Night Movie
Cannon
The Carol Burnett Show
Good Times
Gunsmoke
Hawaii Five-O
Kojak
M*A*S*H
Mannix
The Mary Tyler Moore Show
Maude
Medical Center
Tony Orlando and Dawn
The Waltons
Your Hit Parade

New Series
Cher *
The Friday Comedy Special *
Friends and Lovers
Frigidaire Spring Feature *
The Jeffersons *
Joey & Dad *
Khan! *
The Manhattan Transfer *
The Manhunter
Moses the Lawgiver *
Planet of the Apes
Rhoda
Sons and Daughters
We'll Get By *

Not returning from 1973–74:
Calucci's Department
Dirty Sally
The New CBS Tuesday Night Movies
The New Dick Van Dyke Show
Here's Lucy
The Hudson Brothers Show
The New Perry Mason
Roll Out
The Sonny & Cher Comedy Hour

NBC

Returning Series
Adam-12
Columbo
Emergency!
Ironside
McCloud
McMillan & Wife
Monday Night Baseball
NBC Monday Night at the Movies
The NBC Mystery Movie
NBC Saturday Night at the Movies
Police Story
Sanford and Son
The Wonderful World of Disney

New Series
Amy Prentiss *
Archer *
Ben Vereen...Comin' At Ya *
The Bob Crane Show *
Born Free
Chico and the Man *
The Gladys Knight & the Pips Show
Little House on the Prairie
Lucas Tanner
The Mac Davis Show *
Movin' On
NBC World Premiere Movie
Petrocelli
Police Woman
The Rockford Files
Sierra
The Smothers Brothers Show *
Sunshine *

Not returning from 1973–74:
The Brian Keith Show
Chase
The Dean Martin Comedy World
The Dean Martin Show
Diana
The Flip Wilson Show
The Girl with Something Extra
Lotsa Luck
Love Story
The Magician
Music Country USA
NBC Follies
Needles and Pins

Note: The * indicates that the program was introduced in midseason.

References

Additional sources
 Castleman, H. & Podrazik, W. (1982). Watching TV: Four Decades of American Television. New York: McGraw-Hill. 314 pp.
 McNeil, Alex. Total Television. Fourth edition. New York: Penguin Books. .
 Brooks, Tim & Marsh, Earle (1985). The Complete Directory to Prime Time Network TV Shows (3rd ed.). New York: Ballantine. .

United States primetime network television schedules
1974 in American television
1975 in American television